Kévin Lucien Zohi (born 19 December 1996) is a professional footballer who plays as a winger for Primeira Liga club Vizela. Born in Ivory Coast, he represents the Mali national team.

Club career
Zohi began playing football on the streets at the age of 5, and at the age of 13 moved to the JMG Academy in Mali. In 2015, he moved to the Malian club AS Real Bamako where he successfully began training with the seniors. In the winter of 2016 Zohi trialed with Nice, before joining Strasbourg in January 2017. He made his professional debut with Strasbourg in a 0–0 Ligue 1 tie with Montpellier on 23 February 2018. Zohi scored his first professional goal on 27 October 2018 in a 1–1 draw against Guingamp.

On 23 July 2021, Zohi joined Vizela in Portugal on a three-year contract.

International career
Zohi debuted with the senior Mali national team in a 3–0 friendly win over Ghana on 9 October 2020.

References

External links
 
 
 

1996 births
Living people
People from Lagunes District
Malian footballers
Mali international footballers
Mali under-20 international footballers
Ivorian footballers
Ivorian people of Malian descent
AS Real Bamako players
RC Strasbourg Alsace players
F.C. Vizela players
Championnat National 3 players
Ligue 1 players
Primeira Liga players
Association football forwards
Association football wingers
Malian expatriate footballers
Ivorian expatriate footballers
Malian expatriate sportspeople in France
Ivorian expatriate sportspeople in France
Malian expatriate sportspeople in Portugal
Expatriate footballers in France
Expatriate footballers in Portugal
Malian people of Ivorian descent